Louise Landry Gadbois (27 November 1896 – 10 August 1985) was a Canadian painter associated with the Contemporary Arts Society in Montreal. She is known for her portraiture.

Biography
Marie Marguerite Louise Gadbois was born in 1896 in Montreal, Quebec. She studied painting with Edwin Holgate from 1932 to 1934. Additionally she attended the Art Association of Montreal, studying under John Goodwin Lyman.

In 1941 Gadbois was included in the Première exposition des Indépendants exhibition at Palais Montcalm in Quebec City. This exhibition was organized by Marie-Alain Couturier and included eleven members of the Contemporary Arts Society; Gadbois, Paul-Émile Borduas, Simone Mary Bouchard, Stanley Cosgrove, Eric Goldberg, John Goodwin Lyman, Louis Muhlstock, Alfred Pellan, Goodridge Roberts, Jori Smith, and Philip Surrey. The exhibition traveled to Montreal.

In 1944 Gadbois was in two exhibitions: a joint exhibition with Philip Surrey, and a joint exhibition with her daughter Denyse Gadbois.

Gadbois's portrait of Thérèse Frémont is in the National Gallery of Canada and her  portrait The Refugee is in the Musée du Québec.

Gadbois died in 1985 in Montreal.

References

External links
 Louise Landry Gadbois images on ArtNet

1896 births
1985 deaths
20th-century Canadian women artists
20th-century Canadian artists
Artists from Montreal
Canadian women painters
20th-century Canadian painters
Canadian portrait artists